Carlos Aires (born 1974) is a Spanish artist. A multidisciplinary artist, he is primarily known for his works in photography and sculpture. Aires was born in Ronda, Málaga.

Exhibitions
 2005 EuropART, Vienna. 
 2010 Cinema X: I Like to Watch, Museum of Contemporary Art, Toronto
 2012 Centro de arte contemporáneo de Málaga, Spain.
 2013 Coup de Ville, WARP, Sint-Niklas, Netherlands
2018 Black Sea, in A Short Century: MACBA Collection, Barcelona Museum of Contemporary Art.

Collections
Aires' work is included in the permanent collections of:
Barcelona Museum of Contemporary Art and 
the Artium Museum, Vitoria-Gasteiz, Spain.

See also
 Francesc Abad

References

Spanish artists
People from Málaga
Living people
1974 births